Khangah  is a village in Kapurthala district of Punjab State, India. The village is administrated by a Sarpanch, who is an elected representative.

Demography 
According to the report published by Census India in 2011, Khangah has 96 houses with the total population of 501 persons of which 253 are male and 248 females. Literacy rate of  Khangah is 77.53%, higher than the state average of 75.84%.  The population of children in the age group 0–6 years is 56 which is 11.18% of the total population.  Child sex ratio is approximately 931, higher than the state average of 846.

Population data

References

External links
  Villages in Kapurthala
 Kapurthala Villages List

Villages in Kapurthala district